The World Games are an international multi-sport event comprising sports and sporting disciplines that are not contested in the Olympic Games. They are usually held every four years, one year after a Summer Olympic Games, over the course of 11 days. The World Games are governed by the International World Games Association, under the patronage of the International Olympic Committee.

In the most recent editions, between 25 and 34 sports have been included in the official programme. Several sports or disciplines that were on the programme of The World Games have been discontinued because they are now included in the programme of the Olympic Games. Around 3500 participants from around 100 nations take part.

The World Games differs from other multi-sport events, such as the Olympic Games, in that host cities are not required to construct new venues or facilities for the Games. The competitors are selected by the sports' international federations, as opposed to by National Olympic Committees or national governing bodies. In most disciplines, qualification is by a top ranking at the world championships or a qualification tournament. This is intended to ensure the top athletes in a sport compete at the Games.

The event is officially known as "The World Games", spelled with a capital T.

The first edition of The World Games was held in Santa Clara, California, United States, in 1981, and the eleventh edition was held in Birmingham, Alabama, United States from 7 to 17 July 2022. The current edition was originally intended to be held in 2021, but it was delayed one year due to the COVID-19 pandemic.

History

Inauguration
The idea for a multi-sport event for non-Olympic sports came from the General Association of International Sports Federations (GAISF). Realising that there were few opportunities to become part of the Olympic programme, non-Olympic federations wanted to form their own showcase event to increase the publicity of their sports, which they called The World Games. These federations formed a steering group in early 1979 to decide on the structure and principles of the games and search for a venue.

In May 1979, the steering group announced that they had found a venue for the first event: Santa Clara, USA.

The GAISF steering committee became the World Games Executive Council in October 1979, and the inaugural meeting of the World Games Council was held on 19–22 May 1980, with a purpose of creating the concept of the Games. The World Games Council was renamed the International World Games Association, or IWGA in 1985.

The first edition of The World Games was held in Santa Clara, USA, in 1981. It was opened by Kim Un-yong, President of The World Games I executive committee, at Buck Shaw Stadium. At the opening ceremony, the athletes marched sorted by sport and not by nation.

The 15 sports at the inaugural games included badminton, casting, racquetball, and taekwondo. The first medals of the Games were awarded in the 640 kilo class of tug-of-war, with the gold going to the team from England.

Twentieth century

After the inaugural Games, the West Nally Group, which had provided financing for the Games in Santa Clara, became owners of the rights to the event, and took the second edition to their headquarters in London.

For the third Games in Karlsruhe, 1989, the West Nally Group still owned the commercial rights to the Games, but the host city was responsible for the staff and volunteers organising the event. After this, the IWGA bought back the commercial rights, and the organising committees of the host cities have been responsible for the organisation and financing since. This led to the organisers of The World Games in The Hague (1993) asking the participants to pay accommodation costs.

The 1997 edition of the Games was due to be held in Port Elizabeth, South Africa, but in August 1994, Port Elizabeth pulled out of hosting the Games due to the political situation in the country. Lahti in Finland volunteered to host instead and signed the host contract in January 1995. Airsports, dancesport, aerobics and jujitsu made their debut in Lahti and have been contested at the Games ever since.

Following the Games in Lahti, the IWGA and IOC agreed on a memorandum of understanding, which was signed in 2000 Here, the IOC recognised the importance of The World Games and set out shared values, including the IOC providing patronage to Organising Committees, encouraging multi-sport national teams, and working together on anti-doping. It also set out that "disciplines/events of sport that are not on the Olympic Games programme could be included on the programme of the World Games". A further memorandum of understanding was signed in 2016.

Twenty-first century

In 2001, the Games were held in Akita, Japan – the first time it had been held outside of North America or Europe. Several competitions were delayed or moved to an alternative venue when a typhoon hit the city. For the first time, some National Olympic Committees organised hotel accommodation for their athletes, beyond the time they were hosted by the IWGA.

The World Games in 2005, in Duisburg, Germany, were the first World Games where athletes paraded into the opening ceremony grouped by nation. Also several standards were set in place which continue to this day, such as the television production of all sports and sports grouped by category, such as ball sports and precision sports.

The 2013 Games in Cali, Colombia were particularly noted for the large numbers of spectators, estimated at 500,000. For example, the Bullfight Ring, which was the venue for dancesport, was 'packed' for the salsa dance finals.  This edition of the Games saw the first time a competition was cancelled: due to concerns about temperature and air flow at the Del Pueblo Gymnasium, where the sport of rhythmic gymnastics was taking place, the ribbons event was cancelled.

The 2017 Games in Wrocław, Poland were the first to be broadcast on the Olympic Channel, to 130 countries. Both the raffa and lyonnaise disciplines of boules were cancelled after a storm destroyed the venue and it could not be repaired in time.

In 2015, it was announced that the 11th edition of The World Games was to be held in Birmingham, Alabama, USA in 2021, beating bids from Lima, Peru and Ufa, Russia. On 2 April 2020, the Games were postponed to 2022 so as not to clash with the postponement of the 2020 Olympic Games in Tokyo due to the coronavirus pandemic.

No parasport federations are currently part of the IWGA, but The World Games in Birmingham was the first edition to include parasports, with the inclusion of wheelchair rugby. Birmingham was also to include disabled athletes (one per gender) in archery. The IWGA is also aiming to secure a partnership with the International Paralympic Committee and include a quota for para-athletes.

In 2019, it was announced that The World Games in 2025 will take place in Chengdu, China.

Features

Venues

In order for hosting to be sustainable, organisers of The World Games are not required to build any new venues or facilities.
For example, Sloss Furnaces, a former pig iron-producing blast furnace now in public use, hosted the sport climbing, breakdancing, parkour and beach handball competitions in Birmingham 2022. Athletes stayed at the student accommodations of the University of Alabama at Birmingham (UAB), several of whose sports facilities were used for various events.

Past venues have included the Lahti City Theatre (bodybuilding), Landschaftspark Nord (a former iron foundry in Duisburg), Wrocław Zoo, and Wrocław's Philharmonic Hall, the National Forum of Music.

Even though it is not required, some venues are constructed or renovated for The World Games. For instance, for the 2017 World Games in Wrocław, a new swimming pool and speed skating rink were built, and Olympic Stadium, built in 1928, was renovated and is still used for American football and speedway. Also, for the 2009 World Games, Kaohsiung built a National Stadium – the first stadium in the world to use solar energy technology for its power. Other editions used new facilities that were built for purposes other than the World Games; the main stadium of the 2022 edition, Protective Stadium, was built for UAB's American football team.

Athlete selection

Athletes are selected to compete at The World Games by their sport's international federation, as opposed to their sport's national governing body or National Olympic Committee, as in other multi-sport events. The selections are intended to "achieve a satisfactory balance between competitors' positions on world ranking lists and the fair representation of as many as possible of its member nations".

International federations are obliged to send their best athletes, with The World Games development agenda setting out that sports are only to be included if "the best athletes/teams in the world are present".

International World Games Association

The International World Games Association (IWGA) is the international association responsible for the direction and control of The World Games. Its headquarters are located in Lausanne, Switzerland, and its official language is English.

Its membership consists of 39 international sporting federations. It also works very closely with the Local Organising Committees (LOCs), temporary committees responsible for the organisation of each World Games. LOCs are dissolved after each Games. The IWGA is officially recognised by the International Olympic Committee.

Ceremonies

Opening ceremony

The opening ceremony marks the official start of The World Games. Until Duisburg 2005, athletes paraded into the ceremony grouped by sport. From 2005, they were grouped by nation, and now march in alphabetical order, with the host country and then the judges last.

The Athletes' Oath is taken by an athlete of the host nation, and the Judges' Oath is taken by the chairman of the Tournament Judges' Commission. Parading of flags, speeches and official opening also make up the required parts of the ceremony.
There is also often a musical and artistic aspect of the ceremony. For example, more than 400 artists took part in the opening ceremony of the 2017 World Games in Wroclaw.

Athlete party
 
Since 1993 at The Hague, an athlete party has been held in the middle of the competition, and a similar event is planned for Birmingham 2022. It was intended to allow all athletes to participate in at least one ceremony (opening, athlete party, or closing) during the competition.

Closing ceremony

The closing ceremony ends The World Games and follows the last awards ceremony. Official aspects include speeches, a presentation by the next host city and a handing of the flag of the Games to the representatives of the next host city. In Wroclaw, the second part of the ceremony was a concert performed by local artists.

Editions

Sports

Official sports
For The World Games in 2017 and before, official sports were selected solely by the IWGA. Only sports whose international federations were members of the IWGA could be selected. From 2022, the official sports are selected by both the IWGA and host city and can include some sports whose federations are not part of the IWGA.

As formalised in the memorandum of understanding, "only events that are not on the programme of the Olympic Games can be included in the programme of The World Games". For example, canoe polo is a discipline at The World Games, while canoe sprint and canoe slalom are disciplines at the Olympic Games, despite all three being governed by the International Canoe Federation.

Sports which have been contested at all editions of The World Games are bowling, finswimming, trampoline and tumbling disciplines of gymnastics, karate, powerlifting, roller sports, tug of war and water skiing.

Invitational sports
In addition to the official sports, the host city, in coordination with the IWGA, has been allowed to invite sports to participate in the individual programme. Therefore, these sports can be those whose international federations are not part of the IWGA. For example, the Birmingham Organising Committee have selected men's lacrosse (women's being selected by the IWGA), duathlon, flag football, wushu, and wheelchair rugby.

Some sports or disciplines started in The World Games as invitational sports and then became official, often as their international federations became part of the IWGA. These include the lyonnaise discipline of boules sports, beach handball, sumo, and indoor tug of war.

Starting in Birmingham 2022, there will be no distinction between official and invitational sports. The host city is still able to select up to five optional sports, but they are designated "official" sports, rather than invitational. In addition, the host city will be able to designate "demonstration sports".

Olympic sports
Sports or disciplines which have been part of The World Games and the Olympics include badminton, baseball and softball, karate, rugby, sport climbing, taekwondo, target archery, triathlon, beach volleyball and water polo. Target archery is currently on the programs of both, but The World Games only holds events in divisions that are not contested in the Olympics.

Table of sports

Medal tables

All-time nation medal table

As of the 2022 World Games

All-time athlete medal table
Top ten medal table for athletes

References

External links 
 
 All-time Medal table 
 The World Games 2017 Wrocław

 
Multi-sport events
Recurring sporting events established in 1981
Quadrennial sporting events
1981 establishments in the United States